Stothard is a surname. Notable people with the surname include:

 Anna Eliza Stothard (1790–1883), English historical novelist
 Anna Stothard (born 1983), British novelist, journalist and screenwriter
 Charles Alfred Stothard (1786–1821), English artist and antiquarian
 Edward Stothard (1893–1955), English footballer
 David Stothard (born 1937), Canadian soccer player
 Hamish Stothard (1913–1997), Scottish athlete
 John Russell Stothard (born 1970), British parasitologist
 Peter Stothard (born 1951), English newspaper editor 
 Sarah Sophia Stothard (1825–1901), New Zealand teacher and educationalist
 Thomas Stothard (1755–1834), English artist and engraver
 Grant Stothard  (born 1942), Magistrate for Chesterfield, local poet

See also
Stothert (disambiguation)